Geoffrey Fletcher may refer to:
 Geoffrey S. Fletcher (born 1970), American filmmaker and professor
 Geoffrey Scowcroft Fletcher (1923–2004), British artist and art critic
 Geoffrey Fletcher (cricketer) (1919–1943), English cricketer